Dhar Lok Sabha constituency is one of the 29 Lok Sabha constituencies in the Indian state of Madhya Pradesh. This constituency is reserved for the Scheduled Tribes. This constituency came into existence in 1967. It covers the entire Dhar district and part of Indore district.

Assembly segments
Presently, Dhar Lok Sabha constituency comprises the following eight Vidhan Sabha segments:

Members of Parliament

Election Results

See also
 Dhar district
 List of Constituencies of the Lok Sabha

References

Lok Sabha constituencies in Madhya Pradesh
Dhar district